is a railway station located in Tayoro-chō, Shibetsu, Kamikawa Subprefecture, Hokkaidō, Japan, and is operated by the Hokkaidō Railway Company.

Lines serviced
JR Hokkaidō
Sōya Main Line

Adjacent stations

External links
Ekikara Time Table - JR Tayoro Station (Japanese)

Railway stations in Hokkaido Prefecture
Railway stations in Japan opened in 1903